This is a list of international trips made by Dmitry Medvedev, during his presidency, he made 102 international trips to different countries.

Gallery

List of Trips

See also
List of international presidential trips made by Vladimir Putin
List of international presidential trips made by Boris Yeltsin
List of international trips made by Mikhail Gorbachev

References

External links

 kremlin.ru

International presidential trips
Lists of 21st-century trips
21st century in international relations
Medvedev
Diplomatic visits from Russia
Russia history-related lists
Medvedev